The Newport Historic District is a national historic district in Newport and Oliver Township, Perry County, Pennsylvania, United States. It consists of a large residential neighborhood of primarily vernacular working-class homes, a commercial area, industrial buildings, public buildings, three bridges, and a cemetery.  Of the 418 contributing buildings, 361 are residences.  Notable commercial buildings include the Graham Hotel (1871), Butz Building (1875), and Centennial Building (1876).  The remains of the Jones Warehouse date prior to 1820 and are a part of the David M. Myers Warehouse.

In 2004 the Newport Square underwent a revitalization project in which all the overhead power lines were moved underground or rerouted.  Updates included historic style street lamps, ornamental trees, brick planters and new flag poles.  These changes helped return the square to a more historical appearance.

It was listed on the National Register of Historic Places in 1999.

Places of Note
 Bridge in Newport Borough

Historical Residences
 15 South Second Street, Newport, PA
 20 South Second Street, Newport, PA
 51 South Second Street, Newport, PA
 119 South Second Street, Newport, PA

References 

Geography of Perry County, Pennsylvania
Historic districts on the National Register of Historic Places in Pennsylvania
Second Empire architecture in Pennsylvania
Italianate architecture in Pennsylvania
Working-class culture in Pennsylvania
National Register of Historic Places in Perry County, Pennsylvania